Mhow Diesel Loco Shed is a metre-gauge engine shed located in Mhow, in the Indian state of Madhya Pradesh. It is located to south of Mhow railway station, it falls under the Ratlam railway division of Western Railway. It is the smallest of the three locomotive sheds in the Western Railway zone.

History 

When Loco Shed started 40 YDM-4s were transferred from other MG sheds to restart Loco Shed as Mhow was a steam shed till the 1998 when the steam service was withdrawn at time shed has capacity to hold hundred steam locomotives. Locos now service the isolated MG section from Akola to Indore. Currently it is home 18 YDM-4 locomotives.

Trains

Current 

 Dr. Ambedkar Nagar–Sanawad Passenger

Former 

 Ajmer–Hyderabad Meenakshi Express
 Mhow–Indore Passenger

Locomotive

References

External links 
 Railway Board - Official Website
 Western Railway - Official Website

Mhow
Rail transport in Madhya Pradesh
MHOW
Transport in Mhow
1998 establishments in Madhya Pradesh